Ekolot Elf may refer to:

Ekolot JK 01A Elf
Ekolot KR-010 Elf